Samuel Acquah (10 July 1943 – c. 2014) was a Ghanaian footballer. He competed in the 1964 Summer Olympics. He played in the United States for the Detroit Cougars.

References

External links 
 
  

1943 births
Date of death unknown
Year of death missing
Footballers at the 1964 Summer Olympics
Ghanaian footballers
Olympic footballers of Ghana
1965 African Cup of Nations players
1968 African Cup of Nations players
1970 African Cup of Nations players
Africa Cup of Nations-winning players
Association football defenders
Ghanaian expatriate footballers
Ghanaian expatriate sportspeople in the United States
Expatriate soccer players in the United States
Detroit Cougars (soccer) players
North American Soccer League (1968–1984) players
Ghana international footballers
2010s deaths